Marco Sergio Luciano Pirinoli (born 24 October 1966) is an Italian former sailor who has imported the title of World Champion Tornado (a catamaran close to the F18) and two participations in J.O. in 1992 and 1996 with his brother Walter. He was also 16 years old, World Champion on Moth for the Yacth Club of Cannes (1982). His brother was also a sailor, Walter Pirinoli.

References

External links
 
 
 

1966 births
Living people
Italian male sailors (sport)
Olympic sailors of Italy
Sailors at the 1996 Summer Olympics – Tornado
Europe class world champions
Tornado class world champions
World champions in sailing for Italy